Ministério da Saúde (Ministry of Health) may refer to:
 Ministério da Saúde (Brazil), the Brazilian health ministry.
 Ministério da Saúde (Portugal), the Portuguese health ministry.